Wheatland Township is a civil township of Hillsdale County in the U.S. state of Michigan.  The population was 1,224 at the 2020 census.

Communities
Church's Corners is an unincorporated community within the township. It had a post office from 1870 until 1894.
Locust Corners is an unincorporated community within the township.

Geography

Historic sites
 William Treadwell House is a historic house built in 1860.  It is a Michigan State Historic Site and is also listed on the National Register of Historic Places.

Major highways
 runs south–north near the eastern border of the township.

Demographics
As of the census of 2000, there were 1,258 people, 457 households, and 361 families residing in the township. There were 497 housing units at an average density of 13.9 per square mile (5.4/km). The racial makeup of the township was 97.93% White, 0.56% Native American, 0.16% Asian, and 1.35% from two or more races. Hispanic or Latino of any race were 0.79% of the population.

There were 457 households, out of which 35.4% had children under the age of 18 living with them, 67.8% were married couples living together, 6.8% had a female householder with no husband present, and 20.8% were non-families. 18.6% of all households were made up of individuals, and 6.6% had someone living alone who was 65 years of age or older.  The average household size was 2.75 and the average family size was 3.11.

In the township the population was spread out, with 28.1% under the age of 18, 5.9% from 18 to 24, 28.5% from 25 to 44, 24.4% from 45 to 64, and 13.2% who were 65 years of age or older.  The median age was 38 years. For every 100 females, there were 103.6 males.  For every 100 females age 18 and over, there were 108.5 males.

The median income for a household in the township was $40,000, and the median income for a family was $46,875. Males had a median income of $39,271 versus $22,188 for females. The per capita income for the township was $18,026.  About 3.6% of families and 6.3% of the population were below the poverty line, including 10.8% of those under age 18 and 5.4% of those age 65 or over.

Education
The township is served by four separate public school districts.  The southwestern portion of the township is served by Pittsford Area Schools, while the northwestern portion is served by North Adams-Jerome Schools.  The northeast portion of the township is served by Addison Community Schools, while the southeastern portion is served by Hudson Area Schools—both to the east in Lenawee County.

Notable people
Robert Cox, state representative

References

Townships in Hillsdale County, Michigan
Townships in Michigan